Steven Kotler is an American author, journalist, and entrepreneur. He is best known for his non-fiction books, including Abundance, A Small Furry Prayer, West of Jesus, Bold, The Rise of Superman and Stealing Fire.

Early life and education
Kotler was born in Chicago, Illinois. After attending Orange High School in Cleveland, Ohio, he graduated from the University of Wisconsin, Madison in 1989 with degrees in English and creative writing. In 1993, he received an MA in creative writing from Johns Hopkins University.

Author
Kotler’s books and articles often deal with the intersection of science and culture, and make frequent and extended use of academic work, particularly in the areas of neuroscience, evolutionary theory, ethology, psychopharmacology and psychology. He has written a total of seven non-fiction books Stealing Fire, Tomorrowland, Bold, The Rise of Superman, Abundance, A Small Furry Prayer, West of Jesus, and two novels The Angle Quickest for Flight and Last Tango in Cyberspace.Stealing Fire
Steven Kotler, alongside Jamie Wheal, co-authored Stealing Fire, which brings to light a trillion-dollar economy that has gone unnoticed and unnamed for centuries. The book introduces real-life examples of "flow states" and the neuroscience that all humans are gifted with to unlock our hidden potential. The authors discuss how "ecstatis" is applied in every industry, the evolution of its research and how it is revolutionizing our world.

Tomorrowland
In May 2015, Kotler released, Tomorrowland: Our Journey From Science Fiction To Science Fact.

Bold
In February 2015, Kotler published Bold: How to Go Big, Create Wealth, and Impact the World, his second book with Peter Diamandis. The book discusses the exponential advancement of technology and teaches entrepreneurs how to thrive in such an environment by being nimble and resilient.  Bold debuted on the New York Times bestseller list and remained on the list for six weeks, reaching #6 overall.Best Sellers March 29, 2015 New York Times. May 7, 2015 Since its release, Bold has been reviewed by the New York Times, Wall Street Journal, Washington Post, Financial Times, and others.Knee, Jonathan A. Business Books Reveal a Billionaire Obsession New York Times. May 7, 2015 It was named one of the top 25 books read by corporate America in 2015.

The Rise of Superman
In 2014, Kotler announced his next book, The Rise of Superman: Decoding the Science of Ultimate Human Performance. The book explores the state of consciousness known as "flow", an optimal state in which humans perform and feel their best.  The book includes examples from adventure athletes including big wave surfer Laird Hamilton, skater Danny Way, and big mountain snowboarders Travis Rice and Jeremy Jones.  The Rise of Superman explains how extreme athletes are accelerating their flow states to perform better and how people can use the same tactics to accelerate performance in everyday tasks.

Abundance

In 2012 Kotler published Abundance: The Future Is Better Than You Think with Peter H. Diamandis. The book revolves around the idea that the world is getting better and in the future most people of the world will have access to clean water, food, energy, health care, education, and everything else that is necessary for a first world standard of living, thanks to technological innovation. The authors argue progress in artificial intelligence, robotics, infinite computing, ubiquitous broadband networks, digital manufacturing, nanomaterials, synthetic biology, and many other growing technologies will enable the human race to make greater gains in the following two decades than in the previous two hundred years. By doing so, the authors suggest humans will have the ability to meet and exceed the basic needs of every man, woman, and child on the planet.Abundance debuted at #1 on both Amazon.com and Barnes & Noble's bestseller lists, and at #2 on the New York Times bestseller list. It remained on the NYT bestseller list for nine weeks, gathering reviews and profiles from outlets including The New York Times, The Wall Street Journal, TIME, BusinessWeek, Wired, Slate, and others. Abundance was voted one of the "Top 5 Must Read Business Books of the Year" by Fortune Magazine.

A Small Furry Prayer
In 2007, alongside his wife, Joy Nicholson, Kotler co-founded the Rancho de Chihuahua dog sanctuary in Chimayo, New Mexico. Rancho de Chihuahua specializes in hospice care and long term rehabilitation for special needs dogs. Kotler's experience with Rancho de Chihuahua inspired his 2010 book A Small Furry Prayer: Dog Rescue and the Meaning of Life.A Small Furry Prayer was a Wall Street Journal and SF Chronicle Bestseller.

Angle Quickest for FlightAngle Quickest for Flight was a SF Chronicle Bestseller and was shortlisted for the William L. Crawford IAFA Fantasy Award.

 Blogs 
Previous blogs of Steven's include "Far Frontiers," a blog about technology and innovation for Forbes and "The Playing Field," a blog about the science of sport and culture for Psychology Today.

Bibliography

 Nonfiction West of Jesus: Surfing, Science and the Origin of Belief, 2006A Small, Furry Prayer: Dog Rescue and the Meaning of Life, 2010Abundance: The Future Is Better Than You Think, 2012, co-authored with Peter H. Diamandis
The Rise of Superman: Decoding the Science of Ultimate Human Performance 2014Bold: How to Go Big, Create Wealth, and Impact the World, 2015,  co-authored with Peter H. DiamandisTomorrowland: Our Journey from Science Fiction to Science Fact, 2015Stealing Fire: How Silicon Valley, the Navy SEALs, and Maverick Scientists Are Revolutionizing the Way We Live and Work, co-authored with Jamie Wheal, 2017The Art of Impossible: A Peak Performance Primer, 2021

 Novels 
 The Angle Quickest for Flight, 1999
 Last Tango in Cyberspace, 2019
 The Devil's Dictionary'', 2022

References

External links
 Steven Kotler Personal web page
 Rancho de Chihuahua Steven Kotler's dog sanctuary
 Amazon author’s page
 Michael Krasny’s KQED Forum June 11, 2006 interview with Steven Kotler

Journalists from Illinois
Living people
American non-fiction writers
Writers from Chicago
1967 births